Chaudhvin Ka Chand: The Original Screenplay is a 2014 book that was written by the journalist Dinesh Raheja and the film archivist Jitendra Kothari. It contains the original screenplay—in original Hindi and its English translation—for the 1960 romantic drama Chaudhvin Ka Chand, along with interviews of the film's cast and crew team with the authors, speaking of their roles in the film and their experiences during the production. Upon release, the book was met with positive reviews from critics.

Development and release 
The book marked the journalist Dinesh Raheja and the film archivist Jitendra Kothari's fourth collaborations, having previously written 1996's The Hundred Luminaries of Hindi Cinema, 2004's The Bollywood Saga, and 2012's Sahib Bibi Aur Ghulam: The Original Screenplay. Chaudhvin Ka Chand: The Original Screenplay contains the original screenplay—in Hindi and its English translation—for the 1960 romantic drama Chaudhvin Ka Chand, as well as their interviews with the living cast and crew, and the authors' commentary on the film. In an interview with Daily News and Analysis, Raheja said of the book's writing: "They gave me a rough screenplay, which they must have salvaged. But in those days there was no leather bound script. There are minimum instructions in it and the scene changed several times. So, I saw the film at least 40–50 times."

The book was published in 2014 by Om Books International, and critics were appreciative of it. In an anonymous review in the entertainment portal Bollywood Hungama, "... it must be added that this Muslim social from 1960 could well interest a very select set of readers for whom the book would strictly serve academic purposes. For such students of Indian cinema, the book could well turn out to be an educational pick." Siddhi Pathak from The Indian Express wrote, "The book resonates the charisma and creativity of the legend, Guru Dutt. It successfully makes you relive the film on paper. For any film-amigo or cinema enthusiast, it's an absolute insightful delight." Vivek Tejuja of News18 described the book as a "delight to read", adding, "The commentary and extended analysis are a treat in this book to watch out for."

References

Sources 

 
 
 
 
 

2014 non-fiction books
Indian non-fiction books
Literary collaborations
Books about individual films